Binayak Acharya College is a college near Haradakhandi, in Berhampur, Odisha, India, affiliated to Berhampur University.
It was founded in 1978 as an extension wing for Khallikote College, Brahmapur. It became an independent wing during the 1981-82 session.
In 1984, it was named after the 9th Chief Minister of Odisha Binayak Acharya.
It offers 10+2 and +3 in Science, Commerce and Arts Streams.

References

Colleges affiliated to Berhampur University
Department of Higher Education, Odisha
Education in Berhampur
Universities and colleges in Odisha
1978 establishments in Orissa
Educational institutions established in 1978